James Phelps (January 12, 1822 – January 15, 1900) was a U.S. Representative from Connecticut, son of Lancelot Phelps.

Biography

Born in Colebrook, Connecticut, Phelps attended the public schools, the Episcopal Academy in Cheshire, Connecticut, Trinity College of Hartford, Connecticut, and Yale Law School.

Phelps completed his legal education in the offices of Samuel Ingham and Isaac Toucey, was admitted to the bar in 1845 and commenced practice in Essex, Connecticut.

In 1853, 1854 and 1856 Phelps served in the Connecticut House of Representatives. He served in the Connecticut State Senate in 1858 and 1859.

Phelps served as judge of the superior court of Connecticut from 1863 to 1873. He served as judge of Connecticut's supreme court of errors from 1873 until his resignation in 1875.

Phelps was elected as a Democrat to the 44th and three succeeding Congresses (March 4, 1875 – March 3, 1883). He declined to be a candidate for renomination in 1882, and resumed the practice of law.

He served again as judge of the superior court from 1885 to 1892. He resumed practicing law and was also active in banking. He served as a delegate to several Democratic state conventions.

Death and burial
Phelps died in Essex on January 15, 1900. He was interred at River View Cemetery in Essex.

Family
Phelps was married to Lydia Ingham, the daughter of Samuel Ingham.

References

External links
 

1822 births
1900 deaths
People from Colebrook, Connecticut
Justices of the Connecticut Supreme Court
Democratic Party Connecticut state senators
Democratic Party members of the United States House of Representatives from Connecticut
19th-century American politicians
19th-century American judges